The Camesa is a river located in the north of Spain, a tributary of the Pisuerga.

It rises in the province of Palencia in the municipio of  Brañosera. It runs briefly through the region of Cantabria, where gives its name to a Site of Community Importance.
After passing through the village of Mataporquera, it leaves Cantabria, joining the river Pisuerga in the vicinity of Aguilar de Campoo, again in Palencia.

References

Rivers of Spain
Tributaries of the Pisuerga
Rivers of Cantabria
Rivers of Castile and León